The 1951 by-election for the Australian House of Representatives seat of Macquarie was held on 28 July after the death of the incumbent Australian Labor Party member, former Prime Minister Ben Chifley, who died on 14 June after suffering a heart attack. Chifley's death came less than three months after the 1951 general election.

Candidates
Contesting the seat for the Labor Party was Tony Luchetti, who had been the Lang Labor candidate in Macquarie in 1931 and 1934, his preferences defeating Chifley in 1931. William Blanchard ran as an independent Labor candidate in protest at Luchetti's selection as Chifley's successor.

Their main opponent was William Hannam of the Liberal Party of Australia. Vernon Moffitt, representing the Communist Party of Australia, also ran.

Results

Aftermath
At the following 1954 general election Luchetti retained the seat and was the sole Labor candidate.

See also
 List of Australian federal by-elections

References

1951 elections in Australia
New South Wales federal by-elections